"Gibberish" is a song by American singer MAX. The song was released as a single on March 23, 2015. It features the vocals of Hoodie Allen. The music video was released the same day and  has over 20 million views on YouTube. The song was featured on the dance game, Just Dance 2016.

Upon release, the song was MAX's most successful single to date, peaking at number one on the Twitter Trending 140. The song was put on MAX's EP, Ms. Anonymous, and was included on his studio album, Hell's Kitchen Angel.

In June 2016, when MAX was picked as Elvis Duran's Artist of the Month, he was featured on NBC's Today show hosted by Kathie Lee Gifford and Hoda Kotb and broadcast nationally where he performed "Gibberish" live on the show. The song was nominated for an 'Ardy' at the Radio Disney Music Awards (2016) for Best Song to Lip Sync To.

Charts

Awards and nominations

Release history

References

2015 singles
Max Schneider songs
2015 songs
Songs written by Sean Douglas (songwriter)
Songs written by Jonas Jeberg
Songs written by Morgan Taylor Reid